The  New York Giants season was the franchise's 91st season in the National Football League (NFL) and their sixth season playing their home games at MetLife Stadium in East Rutherford, New Jersey. Tom Coughlin returned for his 12th and final season as the team's head coach. The Giants attempted to secure a playoff berth for the first time since their 2011 season, which concluded with their victory in Super Bowl XLVI.
To honor the late Frank Gifford and Ann Mara, both of whom died earlier in 2015, the Giants added a number 16 decal on their helmets and special patch for Gifford and Mara respectively.

The Giants began the season 0–2 for the third straight year, and in doing so became the first team in NFL history to go 0–2 while holding double digit leads in the 4th quarter in both games. However, they rebounded to win their next three games before losing to the Philadelphia Eagles. The Giants' 2015 season was plagued by their inability to close out games, as the Giants lost 6 games in which they held leads or were tied within the final 2 minutes. These losses included their opening game against the Dallas Cowboys, their home opener against the Atlanta Falcons, a road loss to the New Orleans Saints and two home defeats against the New England Patriots and the New York Jets. Had the Giants won these games, they would have finished 11–5 and would have won the NFC East. After the Washington Redskins defeated the Eagles on December 26 during a Saturday edition of Thursday Night Football, the Redskins clinched the division title of the NFC East, eliminating the Giants from playoff contention for the fourth consecutive year and officially ending the Coughlin/Eli era in New York, after having made the playoffs 5 times and won two Super Bowls, both times against the New England Patriots.

Offseason

Free agents signed

Cuts

Free agents lost

Unsigned

Trades

2015 NFL Draft

Notes
 The Giants acquired an additional seventh-round selection (No. 245 overall) in a trade that sent placekicker Brandon McManus to the Denver Broncos.
 The Giants traded picks No. 108 and No. 245 to receive No. 33 from the Tennessee Titans.

Undrafted free agent signings

Offseason activities
The New York Giants started offseason activities with a rookie minicamp starting on May 9. Organized team activities ran from May 27–29, June 1–2, June 4, June 8–9, June 11–12.
Mandatory mini-camp was held June 16–18.

Injuries
 May 20: During a lifting session, Will Beatty suffered a torn pectoral injury. Beatty will undergo surgery, sidelining him for 5–6 months.
 July 4: When setting off fireworks, Jason Pierre-Paul blasted off his index finger, part of his thumb and middle finger. He has returned.

Staff

Staff changes

The Giants' most notable staff change involves their defensive coordinator position. Following the 2014 season the team fired Perry Fewell after five seasons. To replace him the Giants brought back Steve Spagnuolo, who had been the team's coordinator for the 2007 and 2008 seasons and who was most recently the secondary coach for the Baltimore Ravens.

Final staff

Final roster

Schedule

Preseason

Regular season

Note: Intra-division opponents are in bold text.

Game summaries

Week 1: at Dallas Cowboys
Towards the end of the game, the Cowboys did not have any timeouts, and the Giants were facing 3rd and goal from the Cowboys 1-yard line with 1:43 remaining. However, instead of just kneeing the ball and letting the clock run out, the Giants decided to throw the ball instead. Eli Manning's pass was thrown away, and the clock stopped. Josh Brown would kick a 19-yard field goal to give the Giants a 26-20 lead. The Cowboys marched down the field and got into Giants territory. The drive concluded when Tony Romo threw the game-winning touchdown pass to Jason Witten with 7 seconds left to give the Cowboys the win. Following the game, the Giants were met with heavy criticism from their fans and the media for the throwing play earlier, with most of the criticism being aimed at head coach Tom Coughlin, who later admitted that it was his fault and that the strategy for the game was wrong at the end.

With the loss, the Giants started 0-1.

Week 2: vs. Atlanta Falcons
For the second time in two weeks, the Giants blew a fourth quarter lead inside of 2 minutes. The Falcons went down the field to score with 1:14 remaining after Devonta Freeman ran in for a 1-yard touchdown. The Giants tried to go down the field, but the drive failed, and the Giants lost 24-20.

With the loss, the Giants fell to 0-2.

Week 3: vs. Washington Redskins
The Giants finally got their first win of the season, beating the Redskins 32-21 on Thursday Night Football. The game began with the safety, making this the first game since Super Bowl XLVIII that the first score of the game was a safety.

With the win, the Giants improved to 1-2.

Week 4: at Buffalo Bills

Prior to the season, Bills head coach Rex Ryan expressed that he wanted his team to be last in the league in penalties (the Bills had led the league in penalties in 2014). In that respect, this game was notably embarrassing for the Bills as they committed an outrageous 17 penalties for 135 yards. Five of them were either personal fouls or unsportsmanlike conduct, and two of them negated Bills touchdowns.

Week 5: vs. San Francisco 49ers
The 49ers went down the field to score with 1:45 remaining. The game appeared over after Tramaine Brock appeared to have an interception. However, the interception was reviewed, and after review, the call was overturned, because replay concluded that the ball had hit the ground before Brock was able to control it. The next play, Kenneth Acker was called for pass interference which gave the Giants the ball on the goal line. Larry Donnell caught the game-winning touchdown with 21 seconds left to give the Giants the win.

With the win, the Giants improved to 3-2.

Week 6: at Philadelphia Eagles
The Giants led 7-0 after they scored first on their opening drive. However, the Eagles outscored them 27-0 the rest of the way.

With the loss, the Giants dropped to 3-3.

Week 7: vs. Dallas Cowboys

The Giants ended a five-game losing streak to the Cowboys dating to October 28, 2012 at AT&T Stadium, doing so despite only 289 aggregate yards of offense. Two touchdowns were scored by either defense or special teams, first on a Matt Cassel pick-six run back 58 yards by Dominique Rodgers-Cromartie in the third quarter; in the fourth following a game-tying Cassel score to Devin Street the ensuing kickoff was run back 100 yards by Dwayne Harris. The game earned additional notoriety; in response to the presence on the Cowboys roster of Greg Hardy with domestic violence controversy surrounding him the Giants invited actress and outspoken advocate of domestic-violence victims Mariska Hargitay along with her husband Peter Hermann and their son August Miklos Hermann to be honorary captains; Hargitay and Hermann wore Mark Herzlich jerseys while August wore a jersey of Odell Beckham Jr.

With the win, Tom Coughlin became the 2nd head coach in the Giants history to win 100 regular season games, the first since Steve Owen accomplished the feat in 1944. This was also Coughlin's last home win as Giants head coach.

Week 8: at New Orleans Saints

Eli Manning's six touchdown passes, with three of them to Odell Beckham Jr. were not enough as a late field goal by the Saints sealed the 52-49 victory in a battle of passing offenses. The game lead tied or changed ten times and Manning's six scores and 350 yards were bettered by Drew Brees with 505 yards and seven touchdowns, all overcoming two interceptions.

The 101 combined points scored are tied for the fourth most in NFL history.

Week 9: at Tampa Bay Buccaneers

Jason Pierre-Paul, who suffered an off-season fireworks incident on July 4, made his season debut as the Giants defeated the Buccaneers 32-18.

Week 10: vs. New England Patriots

Meeting for the first time since Super Bowl XLVI, the Giants hosted the undefeated Patriots. Commissioner Roger Goodell was in attendance. The Giants looked to stop the streaking Patriots in a game where both teams saw touchdowns wiped out on penalties. The Giants trailed by 2 at the two-minute warning, and on second down Eli Manning tossed a pass in the end zone to Odell Beckham Jr. Beckham appeared to have the catch, but as he brought the ball up in celebration, it was knocked out by Malcolm Butler in a play eerily similar to a drop by Lee Evans in the closing seconds of the 2011 AFC Championship Game. Manning scrambled for a loss on third down, and Josh Brown kicked the go-ahead field goal to give New York a lead. However, a last second game-winning field goal by the Patriots kicker Stephen Gostkowski ended the Giants' hopes. Although he was cleared to play, Victor Cruz, a day later, announced he would not play this season as he underwent surgery to repair an injured left calf.

Week 12: at Washington Redskins
Odell Beckham Jr. made a tremendous catch during this game, as he made another one-handed catch for a touchdown. However, the catch was not enough, as the Giants trailed 20-0 and could not come back.

With the loss, the Giants fell to 5-6.

Week 13: vs. New York Jets
The Giants would lead 20-10 in the fourth quarter. However, the Jets would march down the field to tie the game with 27 seconds remaining. Randy Bullock would give the Jets the lead in overtime after he converted a 31-yard field goal. The Giants would go down the field, but a critical drop by Odell Beckham Jr. would prove them costly. Josh Brown would miss a 48-yard field goal during overtime, giving the Jets the win. This game was the 5th this season that the Giants have lost when leading with 2 minutes or less in the 4th quarter, with 3 of them coming at home.

With the loss, the Giants fell to 5-7.

Week 14: at Miami Dolphins

It was the first Monday Night meeting between the Giants and the Dolphins.

The game was a shootout and Eli Manning was spectacular, completing 27 of 31 passes, 4 of them touchdowns in a 31-24 win.

This was Tom Coughlin's last win as the Giants head coach.

Week 15: vs. Carolina Panthers

The Giants hosted the undefeated Panthers, which gained attention for the fight between Beckham and Panthers cornerback Josh Norman, which lasted for nearly the entire game. Beckham would draw three personal fouls for his involvement. The Giants managed to erase a 28-point deficit but failed to stop Cam Newton on the Panthers final drive, losing after a game-winning field goal.

Week 16: at Minnesota Vikings

The deflated Giants traveled to Minnesota to take on the Vikings. Already eliminated from the playoffs due to Washington beating Philadelphia the night before to secure the NFC East for the first time since 2012, they were without their star wide receiver Odell Beckham Jr. as he was suspended for his actions in a Week 15 loss against Carolina. The Vikings stingy defense put pressure on Eli Manning all game, forcing Tom Coughlin to bench Manning after three interceptions. The Giants defense was not a factor as they failed to contain the Vikings rushing attack all game long. Linebacker JT Thomas was ejected from the game in the 4th quarter for throwing a punch.

The loss of Beckham was too steep to overcome and the Giants wound up losing 49-17, dropping to 6-9.

Week 17: vs. Philadelphia Eagles

With Odell Beckham Jr. back from his suspension, the Giants hosted the Eagles for the final game of both their seasons, which was also played on Eli Manning's 35th birthday. The Giants offense put up a fight, but a 3rd quarter fumble by Manning that was returned for a touchdown did the Giants in. The Giants attempted a comeback, but down 5 in the final minutes, Manning could not lead the Giants into the end zone. This loss dropped the Giants to 6-10 for the second straight season, and the game proved to be Tom Coughlin's final game coaching the Giants. Coughlin ended with just nine wins in 25 career games against the Eagles. This was the last time the Giants would score 30 points in a game until October 7, 2018.

Standings

Division

Conference

References

New York Giants
New York Giants seasons
New York Giants season
21st century in East Rutherford, New Jersey
Meadowlands Sports Complex